Zsolt Gajdos (born 4 February 1993) is a Hungarian professional footballer who plays as a midfielder for Szeged-Csanád Grosics Akadémia.

Club statistics

Updated to games played as of 1 June 2014.

References

External links

HLSZ 

1993 births
Living people
People from Zakarpattia Oblast
Ukrainian people of Hungarian descent
Hungarian footballers
Association football midfielders
Puskás Akadémia FC players
Békéscsaba 1912 Előre footballers
Csákvári TK players
Szolnoki MÁV FC footballers
Szombathelyi Haladás footballers
Nyíregyháza Spartacus FC players
Zalaegerszegi TE players
Szeged-Csanád Grosics Akadémia footballers
Nemzeti Bajnokság I players
Nemzeti Bajnokság II players